The Aguaytía River is a river in Peru.

References

Rivers of Peru